Mercury City may refer to:

 Mercury City Tower, skyscraper in Moscow, Russia
 Merqury City Meltdown, course in SSX